is a Japanese manga series written and illustrated by Yu Itō. It was serialized in Shogakukan's seinen manga magazines Weekly Big Comic Spirits (2008–2010) and Monthly Big Comic Spirits (2010–2017), with its chapters collected in fourteen tankōbon volumes. Shut Hell earned Itō the New Artist Prize at the 16th Tezuka Osamu Cultural Prize in 2012.

Plot
Sudou, a young man who is plagued with recurring vivid dreams of bloody ancient battles, is approached by Suzuki, a shy and quiet girl. When Suzuki visits Sudou's apartment, she plays an instrument he made, which transports Sudou to the year 1209. He awakes to find that he is now a woman nicknamed  and Suzuki a Mongol prince named Yurul. The story takes place in the early 13th century; Genghis Khan has united the Mongolian clans and is strengthening his forces to end the Western Xia dynasty. The plot follows a Xia soldier, sole survivor of a unit massacred by forces led by Mongol general Harabal. Now driven by vengeance, she is feared by the Mongols as "the Evil One" or Shut Hell in Mongolian for her merciless killing. She accompanies Yurul as he flees his Mongol family to preserve a vital collections of writings, knowing that Harabal will follow them, giving her a chance to kill him.

Publication
Shut Hell is written and illustrated by Yu Itō. The series began in Shogakukan's seinen manga magazine Weekly Big Comic Spirits on December 22, 2008. The series was later transferred to Monthly Big Comic Spirits, where it ran from July 27, 2010 to March 27, 2017. Shogakukan collected its chapters in fourteen tankōbon volumes, released from March 30, 2009 to May 12, 2017.

Volume list

Reception
Shut Hell earned Yu Itō the New Artist Prize at the 16th Tezuka Osamu Cultural Prize in 2012.

References

External links
 

Historical anime and manga
Seinen manga
Shogakukan manga
Winner of Tezuka Osamu Cultural Prize (New Artist Prize)